{{DISPLAYTITLE:C8H11NO2}}
The molecular formula C8H11NO2 may refer to:

 Butyl cyanoacrylate
 4-Deoxypyridoxine
 Dopamine, a neurotransmitter
 Isobutyl cyanoacrylate
 Norfenefrine
 Octopamine
 Octopamine (drug)
 Vanillylamine